Peter Sheaf Hersey Newell (March 5, 1862 – January 15, 1924) was an American artist and writer. He created picture books and illustrated new editions of many children's books.

A native of McDonough County, Illinois, Newell built a reputation in the 1880s and 1890s for his humorous drawings and poems, which appeared in Harper's Weekly, Harper's Bazaar, Scribner's Magazine, The Saturday Evening Post, Judge, and other publications. He later wrote and illustrated several popular children's books, such as Topsys and Turvys (1893), a collection of poems and images which could be viewed upside-down or right-side-up; The Hole Book (1908), which had a literal hole at the center of each page to indicate the path of a bullet; and The Slant Book (1910), which took the shape of a rhomboid and told the story of a baby carriage careening down a hill.

Newell often illustrated the works of other authors, such as Mark Twain, Stephen Crane, John Kendrick Bangs, and Lewis Carroll. He also created a comic strip serial, The Naps of Polly Sleepyhead, which debuted in the New York Herald in 1905. He died in Little Neck, New York in 1924.

Newell's great granddaughter, Laura Lydecker, was also an artist and children's book illustrator. Lydecker illustrated editions of Wind in the Willows and The Country Mouse and the City Mouse.

References

External links

 
 
 
 Peter Newell's Books at nonsenselit.org
 The Rocket Book From the Collections at the Library of Congress
 
Peter Newell Family Papers. Yale Collection of American Literature, Beinecke Rare Book and Manuscript Library.
Peter Newell Collection. Yale Collection of American Literature, Beinecke Rare Book and Manuscript Library.

1862 births
1924 deaths
American cartoonists
American children's writers
People from McDonough County, Illinois
American children's book illustrators